The San Juan Gymnasium is an indoor sporting arena in San Juan, Metro Manila, Philippines.

The arena was home to the Pilipinas MX3 Kings of the ASEAN Basketball League (ABL) and has played host to a number of basketball games of the Philippine Basketball League and the now-defunct Metropolitan Basketball Association. It served as the home court of the San Juan Knights of the MBA. The AirAsia Philippine Patriots used the arena for some of its games during the 2012 ASEAN Basketball League season. The FlipTop Battle League commonly used the arena during championship tournaments.

References

External links
City of San Juan official website
San Juan Gym

Sports venues in Metro Manila
Indoor arenas in the Philippines
Basketball venues in the Philippines
ASEAN Basketball League venues
Buildings and structures in San Juan, Metro Manila